Ben Page (born 9 January 1965) is a market researcher and chief executive officer of Ipsos. He has worked there since 1987, having graduated from St. John's College, Oxford the previous year.

Career
From 1987-1992 Page worked on corporate reputation and consumer research, working for companies like Shell, BAE Systems, Sky TV and IBM. Since 1992 he has worked closely with both Conservative and Labour ministers and senior policy makers across government, leading on work for Downing Street, the Cabinet Office, the Home Office and the Department of Health, as well as a wide range of local authorities and NHS Trusts.

He has served on a range of independent commissions and reviews and is a member of the advisory boards of the King's Fund, Institute of Public Policy Research (IPPR), and the Social Market Foundation (SMF). He sits on the Economic and Social Research Council (ESRC) at UK Research and Innovation (UKRI). He also serves as a trustee for the Centre for Ageing Better

He was one of a group of executives involved in the management buyout of MORI in 2000 and its subsequent sale to Ipsos in 2005. From 2000-2009 he led the Ipsos MORI Social Research Institute, becoming Ipsos UK CEO in 2009.  In September 2021 he was appointed as the CEO of Ipsos.

Honours & Awards
He was awarded the Market Research Society (MRS) Silver medal award in 2005.

In 2015, he was ranked 3rd on a list of 100 Most Connected Men in Britain by GQ.

In 2016, Page was elected a Fellow of the Academy of Social Sciences (FAcSS).

In 2019, he was elected a Fellow of the Market Research Society (FMRS)

In 2023 he was ranked one of the three most influential CEOs in France on social media by Les Echoes

References

British businesspeople
1965 births
Living people
Market researchers
Alumni of St John's College, Oxford
Fellows of the Academy of Social Sciences